The Brig is a play written by Kenneth H. Brown (1936–2022) based on his experiences as a U.S. Marine. It was first performed in New York by The Living Theatre on May 13, 1963, with a production filmed in 1964 by Jonas Mekas. The Brig received three Obie Awards in 1964, for Best Production (play), Best Design (Julian Beck) and Best Direction (Judith Malina).

Summary
The play depicts a typical day in a U.S. Marine Corps military prison called the brig. Brown spent 30 days in a brig for being absent without leave while serving with the Third Marines at Camp Fuji, Japan in the 1950s.

Revival
The Brig was revived in New York in 2007, and it received an Obie Special Citation for its ensemble and director Judith Malina. In 2009, it was performed as an unlicensed production at the New World School of the Arts, Theatre Division in Miami, produced by Dean Patrice Bailey and directed by Matthew D. Glass. No legal action was taken.

References

Further reading

External links
 Greene, Alexis. Review at CurtainUp. Retrieved July 25, 2016.

1963 plays
Works about the United States Marine Corps
1964 independent films
American independent films
Films directed by Jonas Mekas
1960s avant-garde and experimental films
American avant-garde and experimental films